Aspalathin is a C-linked dihydrochalcone glucoside found in rooibos tea, a herbal tea prepared from the South African rooibos plant, Aspalathus linearis (Fabaceae).

It was first isolated in 1965 by chromatography.

It has demonstrated antidiabetic activity.

References

External links

Dihydrochalcone glycosides
Phenol glucosides